Anepsiozomus sobrinus is a species of hubbardiid short-tailed whipscorpions that is endemic to the Seychelles, and is found on Aride and Cousine Islands. It can be found in leaf litter in coastal woodlands. It is threatened by the rising sea level.

References

Schizomida
Endangered animals
Endemic fauna of Seychelles
Animals described in 2001